The Pittsylvania County Clerk's Office is a historic county clerk's office located at Chatham in Pittsylvania County, Virginia.  It was built in 1812, and is a one-story, "L"-shaped brick structure.  It housed the county clerk's office until 1853, when those offices were moved to the newly constructed Pittsylvania County Courthouse. The building was restored by the Pittsylvania County Historical Society and houses a small museum.

It was listed on the National Register of Historic Places in 1982.

References

External links
 Pittsylvania Historical Society: 1767 Callands Clerk's Office

History museums in Virginia
Government buildings on the National Register of Historic Places in Virginia
Government buildings completed in 1812
Buildings and structures in Pittsylvania County, Virginia
National Register of Historic Places in Pittsylvania County, Virginia